Ian Keith Meakins (born 31 August 1956) is a British businessman. He was the chief executive of Wolseley plc, a British multinational building materials distribution company, from 2009 to 2016.

Early life
He was educated at St Catharine's College, University of Cambridge.

Career
From 1978 to 1985, Meakins was a brand manager with Procter & Gamble, from 1985 to 1988, a senior manager with Bain & Company, and from 1988 to 1991 a Founding Partner at Kalchas Group (management consulting). From 1992 to 2004, Meakins was with Diageo plc, rising to President of European Major Markets and Global Supply. He was CEO of Alliance UniChem plc until its merger with Boots in July 2006. Meakins later served as chief executive of Travelex Holdings Ltd.

Meakins was CEO of Wolseley plc from 13 July 2009 to August 2016, when he was succeeded by John Martin.

Meakins is also director of the Impetus Trust, and a non-executive director of Centrica plc.

Personal life
Meakins is married, with three children.

References

1956 births
Living people
Alumni of St Catharine's College, Cambridge
British chief executives
British corporate directors
Bain & Company employees
Centrica people